Hovey C. McDonald (c. 1887 – June 12, 1941) was an American football, basketball, wrestling, and soccer coach. He served as the head football coach (1923) and head basketball coach (1924–1935) at San Jose State University in San Jose, California. McDonald was also the director of men's physical education at San Jose State from 1927 to 1940. He died of a heart attack at the age of 53, on June 12, 1941.

Head coaching record

Football

References

Year of birth missing
1880s births
1941 deaths
Oregon State Beavers wrestling coaches
San Jose State Spartans football coaches
San Jose State Spartans men's basketball coaches
San Jose State Spartans men's soccer coaches
American soccer coaches